Nowhere to Hide is the second and last studio album released by Philadelphia street punk band The Virus It was released in 2002 on Punk Core Records.

Track list

References

2002 albums